William F. Wu (born March 13, 1951) is a Chinese-American science fiction, fantasy, and crime author.

Literary career
Born March 13, 1951, in Kansas City, Missouri, Wu had his first professional fiction publication, a short story, published in 1977. Previous to that, he had letters published in comic books and articles in comics fanzines. Since then, Wu's traditionally published books include 13 novels, one scholarly work, and a collection of short stories. He has also brought out reprints and audio books through Boruma Publishing, including as of 2020 Intricate Mirrors, a collection of science fiction stories; Interlaced Pathways, a collection of contemporary fantasy stories; and 10 Analogs of the Future, of the ten collaborations Wu and Rob Chilson had published in Analog magazine.

His more than seventy published works of short fiction have been nominated for the Hugo Award twice individually; his work has been nominated for the Nebula Award twice and once for the World Fantasy Award. His short story "Goin' Down to Anglotown" was in the anthology The Dragon and the Stars, which won Canada's Aurora Award in the category of Best Related Work in English. "Goin' Down to Anglotown" was also a finalist for the Sidewise Award. He is also the author of "Hong on the Range," a novel that incorporates his short story "Hong's Bluff," and "MasterPlay," in 1987, about computer wargamers. The latter is based on Wu's 1979 novelette "On the Shadow of a Phosphor Sheen," which was reprinted several times with the incorrect title of "On the Shadow of a Phosphor Screen." One of his stories was adapted into a Twilight Zone episode, "Wong's Lost and Found Emporium". Though Wu did not write the teleplay for the episode, he was present for its filming.

Wu has written eight novels using the Three Laws of Robotics invented by Isaac Asimov, including two entries in the Isaac Asimov's Robot City series, volumes 3 (Cyborg) and 6 (Perihelion). He also wrote all six novels in Isaac Asimov's Robots in Time series. The two series in Asimov's universe were written to Young Adult standards, though they are not labeled as such. The latter was the first series licensed from Asimov's estate after his death.

Wu and his longtime friend Rob Chilson had ten collaborations published in Analog magazine in the 1980s and '90s. He also collaborated with Ted Reynolds in two stories published in the 1970s and one in the 1,000th issue of Analog magazine, in 2015. He is one of the writers in the Wild Cards anthology series edited by George R.R. Martin and has an ongoing series of stories in the War World anthologies edited by John F. Carr.

He has been gradually bringing out much of his backlog, including "Hong on the Range" and "A Temple of Forgotten Spirits," which collects ten stories first published in "Pulphouse: The Hardback Magazine" about hitchhiker Jack Hong, who meets figures from Chinese and Chinese-American folklore and history. These have been brought out as ebooks, POD paperbacks, and audiobooks.

Wu is also the author of The Yellow Peril (1982), a revised version of his doctoral dissertation in American Culture from the University of Michigan on American fiction's evolving depiction of Chinese and Chinese-Americans. Wu has stated that he dislikes the terms "Sino-American" and "Oriental", preferring terms such as "Asian", "Asian-American", Chinese, and Chinese-American. As a fiction writer, he has always given his stories Asian characters, usually as protagonists and sometimes as supporting characters. Some of his fiction involves ethnic and racial topics and some involves universal issues.

Because "William" and "Wu" are very commonplace names, some of William F. Wu's achievements have inevitably been misattributed to another William Wu, or vice versa. William F. Wu has made a hobby of locating, contacting and meeting other people named William Wu (with or without the same middle initial). Photographs of Wu posing with various friends and acquaintances of the same name have been published in Locus and other publications.

Bibliography

Books 
 Isaac Asimov's Robot City: Cyborg (1987)
 Isaac Asimov's Robot City: Perihelion (1988)

Short fiction 

Stories

References

External links 

1951 births
20th-century American male writers
20th-century American novelists
American male novelists
American people of Chinese descent
American science fiction writers
Analog Science Fiction and Fact people
Living people
Novelists from Missouri
University of Michigan alumni
Writers from Kansas City, Missouri